The CS 34 is a Canadian sailboat, that was designed by Tony Castro and first built in 1989. The design is out of production.

Production
The boat was built by CS Yachts in Canada and is derived from the MG 335 also designed by Castro and built by MG Yachts starting in 1986. The MG 335 has a lighter displacement, a fractional rig and a shorter mast.

Design
The CS 34 is a small recreational keelboat, built predominantly of fibreglass. It has a masthead sloop rig, an internally-mounted spade-type rudder and a fixed fin keel. It displaces .

Three additional keels were available, a shoal draft keel, a winged keel and a semi-elliptical deep-fin version with a terminal weighted bulb. The boat is fitted with a Japanese Yanmar 2GM20 diesel engine.

The boat has a PHRF racing average handicap of 129 with a high of 132 and low of 129.

See also
List of sailing boat types

Related development
MG 335

Similar sailboats
Beneteau 331
Beneteau First Class 10
C&C 34
C&C 34/36
Catalina 34
Coast 34
Columbia 34
Columbia 34 Mark II
Creekmore 34
Crown 34
Express 34
Hunter 34
San Juan 34
Sea Sprite 34
Sun Odyssey 349
Tartan 34 C
Tartan 34-2
Viking 34

References

Keelboats
1980s sailboat type designs
Sailing yachts
Sailboat type designs by Tony Castro
Sailboat types built by CS Yachts